Wellington Council was a local government area in the Orana region of New South Wales, Australia. The former area is located adjacent to the Macquarie River and the Mitchell Highway.

Following an independent review, on 12 May 2016 the Minister for Local Government announced the dissolution of the Wellington Shire Council and the Dubbo City Council, together with the establishment of the Western Plains Regional Council with immediate effect.

The former Wellington Council area included Wellington, Maryvale, Geurie, North Yeoval, Dripstone, Mumbil, Stuart Town and Euchareena.

Council

Former composition and election method
Prior to its dissolution, Wellington Council was composed of nine councillors elected proportionally as a single ward. All councillors were elected for a fixed four-year term of office. The mayor was elected by the councillors at the first meeting of the council. The most recent election was held on 8 September 2012, and the makeup of the former council was as follows:

The final Council, elected in 2012 and dissolved in 2016, in order of election, was:

References

Former local government areas of New South Wales
2016 disestablishments in Australia
1949 establishments in Australia